"Famous Last Words" is a song by American rock band My Chemical Romance. It was released as the band's second single on January 22, 2007 from their third studio album, The Black Parade. It is also the band's ninth overall single, and the final track on The Black Parade (if the hidden track "Blood" is not counted). The music video premiered on December 12, 2006 on MTV2 and on December 13, 2006 on the Much Music program, and on MuchOnDemand in Canada.

In the United Kingdom and other territories, the single was released as a two-part square shaped vinyl picture disc. Part one came in a gatefold stickered clear sleeve, with a space to 'slot' part two into.

Promotion
"Famous Last Words" was released to radio on January 9, 2007. The video was officially premiered in the United States on the January 11 episode of Total Request Live, and debuted on the countdown the following Tuesday at No. 5, the band's highest TRL debut for a video. It went on to become their third No. 1 video on the countdown (following "Helena" and "The Ghost of You"). On March 26, 2007, the video retired at No. 5 on TRL. On March 12, 2007, they performed the song on The Tonight Show with Jay Leno. It was made available for download for the video game Guitar Hero II for the Xbox 360 on August 15, 2007, along with "Teenagers", and "This Is How I Disappear"; included with the game already was the song "Dead!".

Chart performance
"Famous Last Words" debuted at No. 68 on the UK Singles Chart on downloads alone on January 14, 2007. It was physically released as a single on January 22. It climbed to No. 38 in its second week, still on downloads. "Famous Last Words" marked My Chemical Romance's second top 10 hit in the UK, reaching No. 8. On January 24, 2007, the video for "Famous Last Words" reached the No. 1 spot on TRL after a seven-day climb to the top from their debut at No. 5. In early February, the song debuted on the U.S. Billboard Hot 100 at No. 93 before reaching its peak at No. 88.

Music video

The official video for "Famous Last Words" was directed by Samuel Bayer and was filmed before the band had even named the song. The music video shows the Black Parade float that the band performed on in "Welcome to the Black Parade" burning and destroyed. The rest of the background is scattered with burning props from the "Welcome to the Black Parade" video, and fire is seen all around. All followers of The Black Parade have abandoned the band, and they appear to be in a desperate state. Lead singer Gerard Way looks particularly rough, and he seems be dying or extremely ill because of the makeup he is wearing, especially around his eyes. This makeup is similar to that worn by The Patient in the "Welcome to the Black Parade" video. Way adopts a wide-eyed, insane-looking facial expression. In some parts of the video, he can be seen wearing a mask with a skull design on it. The band's condition deteriorates as the song goes on until they revert to thrashing around in the dirt while performing. At the end of the video, they drop their instruments and run away from the burning float.

Although this video appears to represent a relatively basic concept in comparison to past videos, it is regarded by fans as by far the darkest video the band has created. In an interview for the music video, Way said that it was written at "the darkest period in this band's career". A shortened edit of the song is used in the video, with one bridge and two chorus repeats removed. The instrumentals at the end of the song continue in the video, with a sustained guitar chord accompanying the last few vocal lines; in the album version, they were faded out by engineer Chris Lord-Alge until only Way's voice and a harmony of other band members can be heard, along with a backing of soft organ chords.

Several members sustained injuries, some serious, during the filming of the video. Drummer Bob Bryar sustained second and third degree burns on the back of his legs while shooting, yet persisted in staying until the recording was finished. This burn later resulted in gangrene. Way tore muscles in his leg and foot when Frank Iero tackled him while he was in a kneeling position, leaving him in a hospital for several days. Way recalls that, during the filming, they were all "mortified" from the engulfing flames surrounding the set. After the stay in the hospital, the doctors refused to let them perform in San Diego as the band originally planned. Ray Toro fractured his fingers also during shooting and Bob Bryar received multiple blisters around his hand as a result of extreme playing over a long period of time.

The video premiered in the United States on Total Request Live on January 11, 2007. On January 24, 2007, the video reached the No. 1 spot on TRL, and spent nine days at the top of the countdown, before becoming the band's first video to retire on the countdown on March 26, 2007. The US version of the video is mostly the same as the version first seen in the UK, the only difference being that it completely cuts out Bryar's incident with the heat at the end of the video. This version has started to air on British television, or at least on the music channels Scuzz TV and Kerrang! TV.

As of September 2021, the song has 122 million views on YouTube.

Track listing
 All songs written by My Chemical Romance.
Version 1 (promotional CD)

Version 2 (CD and 7" vinyl)

Version 3 (7" vinyl)

Version 4 (CD)

Version 5 (digital download)

Charts and certifications

Weekly charts

Year-end charts

Certifications

References

My Chemical Romance songs
2007 singles
Music videos directed by Samuel Bayer
The Black Parade (rock opera)
Song recordings produced by Rob Cavallo
2006 songs
Reprise Records singles